Demarest-Atwood House is located in Cresskill, Bergen County, New Jersey, United States. The house was built in 1793 and was added to the National Register of Historic Places on July 24, 1984.

See also
National Register of Historic Places listings in Bergen County, New Jersey

References

Cresskill, New Jersey
Houses on the National Register of Historic Places in New Jersey
Houses completed in 1793
Houses in Bergen County, New Jersey
National Register of Historic Places in Bergen County, New Jersey
New Jersey Register of Historic Places